Zir-e Bagh-e Shah (also Romanized as Zīr-e Bāgh-e Shāh; also known as Behshīrī, Maḩalleh-ye Zīr-e Bāgh-e Shāh, Qoroq, and Shahīd Beheshtī) is a village in Shirkuh Rural District, in the Central District of Taft County, Yazd Province, Iran. At the 2006 census, its population was 119, in 53 families.

References 

Populated places in Taft County